Nirmala Convent High School (NCHS) is a K-10 English medium co-educational convent school in Nashik, Maharashtra, India that was established in 1964. It is governed by the Franciscan Hospitaller Sisters of the Immaculate Conception and affiliated with the Maharashtra State Board of Secondary and Higher Secondary Education. It is headquartered in India at Mary Hill, Bandra, Mumbai, whose head is Sr. Eunice Menezes, a former principal of the school. The school follows the Rule of Life of the Third Order of St. Francis of Assisi.

Houses 
There are four student groups known as houses and students represent their house by wearing its respective colours and for the convenience of sport activities. These are:

 Ruby (Red) - motto Courage
 Emerald (Green) - motto Bravery
 Sapphire (Blue) - motto Sacrifice
 Topaz (Yellow) - motto Honesty

As per the Athletic Meet of 2017, the current championship is held by the Sapphire (Blue) house. Every year several programs are held on various occasions that focus on extra-curricular and cultural activities of the students. Republic Day, Board of Honour installation ceremony, Independence Day, Teacher's Day, Christmas Tablo etc. are some important annual events held at NCHS. Besides, Grand Sports Day and Parents' Day are special events that are held alternate yearly.

Facilities 
This school is equipped with a variety of facilities including a computer laboratory, audio-visual room, science laboratory and library. There is one playground, a basketball court, a football ground, a volleyball court, and a small park for students of kindergarten. It has two halls of recreation.

References

External links 
 

Franciscan high schools
Catholic secondary schools in India
Primary schools in India
High schools and secondary schools in Maharashtra
Christian schools in Maharashtra
Private schools in Maharashtra
Schools in Nashik
Educational institutions established in 1964
1964 establishments in Maharashtra